The Sacco-Vanzetti Affair: America on Trial is a 2009 book on Sacco and Vanzetti written by Moshik Temkin and published by Yale University Press.

Bibliography

External links 
 

2009 non-fiction books
English-language books
Yale University Press books
American history books
Works about Sacco and Vanzetti